Steve Reardon (born 5 August 1971) is a former professional rugby league footballer.

Background
Reardon was born in Temora, New South Wales, Australia.

Playing career
Reardon made his first grade debut for Canterbury against arch rivals Parramatta in 1991.  Reardon played mainly reserve grade in his first few seasons at Canterbury and was not included in the 1994 and 1995 grand final squads.  Reardon played from the interchange bench for the Canterbury-Bankstown Bulldogs in their loss at the 1998 NRL grand final to the Brisbane Broncos. Reardon played his last match for Canterbury in their 2003 preliminary final loss against the Sydney Roosters.

Reardon captain-coached the Temora Dragons to the 2004 Group 9 premiership.

References

External links
Bulldogs profile

1971 births
Living people
Australian rugby league players
Canterbury-Bankstown Bulldogs players
Rugby league second-rows
Rugby league locks
Rugby league players from Temora, New South Wales